Vitaliy Hrebeniuk (born 27 September 2001 in Kremenets, Ukraine) is a Ukrainian Nordic combined skier. He is bronze medallist of the 2023 Winter World University Games.

Career
Hrebeniuk started his international career when he competed at the 2018 Junior World Championships in Kandersteg, Switzerland, where he was 50th in the NH/10 km competition. He participated at four Junior World Championships between 2018 and 2021. His best personal results were 33rd in HN/10 km and NH/10 km competitions in both 2020 and 2021. He later participated at Senior World Championships.

At the 2023 Winter World University Games, Hrebeniuk finished 6th in the normal hill/10 km and 6th in the mass start 10 km/normal hill. On 17 January, he won a bronze medal in the team sprint event with Dmytro Mazurchuk, which was the first-ever medal for Ukraine in this sport at the Winter Universiades. He represented Lviv State University of Physical Culture.

Results

World Championships

References

External links
 

2001 births
Living people
Ukrainian male Nordic combined skiers
Universiade medalists in nordic combined
Universiade bronze medalists for Ukraine
Competitors at the 2023 Winter World University Games
Medalists at the 2023 Winter World University Games
21st-century Ukrainian people